Gems: The Duets Collection is the 21st studio album by American pop singer Michael Bolton. The album was released on Montaigne Records / Legacy Recordings / Sony Music on 21 June 2011. It features productions by acclaimed songwriters, producers and musicians including A. R. Rahman, David Foster, Dann Huff and Rudy Pérez.

Track listing
"Love Is Everything" (feat. Rascal Flatts) (Michael Bolton/Gary LeVox/Jay DeMarcus/Joe Don Rooney/Justin Niebank)
"Fields of Gold" (feat. Eva Cassidy) (Sting)
"Sajna" (feat. A. R. Rahman) (A.R. Rahman/Blaaze)
"Pride (In the Name of Love)" (feat. Anne Akiko Meyers) (Bono/The Edge/Adam Clayton/Larry Mullen Jr.)
"I'm Not Ready" (feat. Delta Goodrem) (Delta Goodrem/Vince Pizzinga)
"Over the Rainbow" (feat. Paula Fernandes) (Harold Arlen/E. Y. Harburg)
"When A Man Loves a Woman / It's a Man's Man's Man's World" (medley feat. Seal) (Calvin Lewis/Andrew Wright/James Brown/Betty Jean Newsome)
"The Prayer" (feat. Lara Fabian) (David Foster/Carole Bayer Sager/Alberto Testa/Tony Renis)
"You Are So Beautiful" (feat. Chris Botti) (Billy Preston/Bruce Fisher)
"Make You Feel My Love" (feat. Helene Fischer) (Bob Dylan)
"Hallelujah" (feat. MB's Children's Choir) (Leonard Cohen)
"Steel Bars" (feat. Orianthi) (Michael Bolton/Bob Dylan)
Asian edition bonus tracks: "How Am I Supposed to Live Without You" (feat. Coco Lee) as track 2, and "Said I Loved You...But I Lied" (feat. Agnes Monica) as track 14. The others slightly to as tracks 3-13.

References

Michael Bolton albums
2011 albums